Augustin Rösler (6 March 18512 April 1922) was a Prussian theologian and sociologist who wrote both on the history of Christianity and contemporary issues. His best known work is Die Frauenfrage vom Standpunkte der Natur, der Geschichte und der Offenbarung, a treatise on the woman question published in 1893 (with a significantly expanded second edition in 1907).

Personal life 
Rösler was born in Góra on 6 March 1851.

He died in Wrocław on 2 April 1922.

Writing 
Augustin Rösler was the first German Catholic to discuss the woman question from a Catholic viewpoint. 

Among his works is a monograph on the writing of Prudentius. His Die Frauenfrage vom Standpunkte der Natur, der Geschichte und der Offenbarung, translated into French as La Question Féministe examinée au point de vue de la Nature, de l'Histoire et de la Révélation (The Woman Question, Considered from the Standpoint of Nature, History, and Revelation) was widely reviewed at the time. The work was a reply to August Bebel's book Die Frau und der Sozialismus. Whereas Bebel demands that women and men be treated as equal, Rösler emphasized that there is "fundamentally equal morality of the sexes," while at the same time he stressed that a woman's freedom lies in the ability to fulfill her role as a mother.

In 1899, Franz Hitze invited Rösler to discuss the woman question at a conference titled Praktisch-Sozialer Kursus in Strasbourg. He decided to write Wahre und Falsche "Frauen-Emanzipation," which translates to True and False Emancipation of Women, which contained the same content as the speech, but with a more detailed discussion of the topics of women at medical university courses and women's suffrage.

In Wahre und Falsche "Frauen-Emanzipation", Rösler explains his ideas of what rights women should or should not be given. The book consists of an introduction, followed by three main chapters that each focus on distinct aspects of a woman's life, and a conclusion. While explaining the problems of the Frauenfrage, also known as the woman question, Rösler bases his arguments on quotes from the Bible, metaphors or direct quotes from women or men of his time. Rösler was seen as revolutionary, because he was one of the first Catholics to criticize that women and men are not treated in a balanced way. More specifically, Rösler, on the one hand, demands that women deserve more rights than they have in certain fields, but on the other hand he argues that their rights should only be enough to help with her task as a mother and wife.

Reception 
Rösler's call for more rights for women, although limited, were seen as too liberal by many bishops of the time. The author's efforts to speak to other men, with the aim to free up some space for women in order to allow a more liberal development, was seen as revolutionary. Gnauck-Kühne was a friend and correspondent of Rösler's.

Works 
 
 
 Rösler, Augustin (1907, 2nd edition). Die Frauenfrage vom Standpunkte der Natur, der Geschichte und der Offenbarung (in German). Freiburg im Breisgau: Herdersche Verlagshandlung, 1907.
  (Reprinted by Alphonsus-Buchhandlung in Münster in 1904).

References 

1851 births
1922 deaths
19th-century German Catholic theologians
19th-century German writers
19th-century German male writers
Contributors to the Catholic Encyclopedia
German sociologists
People from Góra